Eoin Quigley (born 13 October 1981) is an Irish hurler who played as a centre-forward for the Wexford senior team.

Born in Piercestown, County Wexford, Quigley first played competitive hurling whilst at school at Wexford CBS. He first made his mark on the inter-county scene when he first linked up with the Wexford under-21 team. He made his senior debut in the 2004 championship. Quigley went on to play a key part for Wexford for almost a decade and won one Leinster medals and one National Hurling League (Division 2) medal.

As a member of the Leinster inter-provincial team at various times, Quigley won one Railway Cup medal in 2009. At club level he is a two-time championship medallist with St Martin's, before later transferring to Sarsfields where he won another championship medal.

Throughout his career Cloonan made 30 championship appearances. He announced his retirement from inter-county hurling on 28 January 2014.

His father, John, as well as his uncles, Dan, Martin and Pat, all played for Wexford, with some experiencing All-Ireland success.

Quigley also had a spell as an association footballer with Bohemians.

Honours

Team
St Martin's
Wexford Senior Hurling Championship (2): 1999, 2008

Sarsfields
Cork Senior Hurling Championship (1): 2010

Wexford
Leinster Senior Hurling Championship (1): 2004
National Hurling League (Division 2) (1): 2010

Leinster
Railway Cup (1): 2009

References

1981 births
Living people
St Martin's (Wexford) hurlers
Sarsfields (Cork) hurlers
Wexford inter-county hurlers
Bohemian F.C. players
Association footballers not categorized by position
Republic of Ireland association footballers